Bruno Ferreira dos Santos (born 14 September 1994), known as Bruno Ferreira or simply Bruno, is a Brazilian footballer who plays for Aimoré as a right back.

Career
Born in São Paulo, Bruno Ferreira graduated from Portuguesa's youth system. On 28 October 2014 he made his professional debut, starting in a 0–3 away loss against Oeste, with his side being relegated to Série C for the first time ever.

On 8 November, again as a starter, Bruno Ferreira provided the assist for Luan's only goal in a 1–0 home success over Luverdense. Late in the month he scored his first professional goal, netting the first of a 2–3 home loss against Vila Nova.

On 23 December Bruno Ferreira moved to Vasco da Gama, newly promoted to Série A. On 6 February 2015, he was loaned to Bragantino until May.

References

External links
Vasco da Gama official profile  

1994 births
Living people
Footballers from São Paulo
Brazilian footballers
Association football defenders
Campeonato Brasileiro Série A players
Campeonato Brasileiro Série B players
Campeonato Brasileiro Série C players
Associação Portuguesa de Desportos players
CR Vasco da Gama players
Clube Atlético Bragantino players
Red Bull Brasil players
Tombense Futebol Clube players
Clube Esportivo Aimoré players